Helena Horká (born 15 June 1981) is a Czech female volleyball player, who plays as an outside-spiker for MKS Dąbrowa Górnicza.

She was part of the Czech Republic women's national volleyball team at the 2002 FIVB Volleyball Women's World Championship in Germany. She also competed at the 2001 Women's European Volleyball Championship and 2007 Women's European Volleyball Championship.

Clubs
  VK Královo Pole Brno (1999–2003)
  Volley Köniz (2003–2004)
  O.F.A. Apollonios (2004–2005)
  Panellinios V.C. (2005–2007)
  Winiary Kalisz (2007–2008)
  BKS Stal Bielsko-Biała (2008–2010)
  VK Prostějov (2011–2012)
  BKS Stal Bielsko-Biała (2012–2016)
  MKS Dąbrowa Górnicza (2016–present)

See also
 :pl:Helena Horká
 :fr:Helena Horká

References

External links
 
 Helena Horká at Orlen Liga 
 Helena Horká at WorldOfVolley
 Helena Horká at EuroSport.onet.pl 
 Helena Horká at EuroSport.fr 
 Helena Horká at the International Volleyball Federation

1981 births
Sportspeople from Brno
Living people
Czech women's volleyball players
Expatriate volleyball players in Switzerland
Expatriate volleyball players in Greece
Expatriate volleyball players in Poland
Czech expatriate sportspeople in Switzerland
Czech expatriate sportspeople in Greece
Czech expatriate sportspeople in Poland
Outside hitters